The Best Damn Tour was the third concert tour by Canadian recording artist, Avril Lavigne. Supporting her third studio album, The Best Damn Thing (2007), the tour played over 100 concerts in North America, Europe and Asia. The trek was recorded at the Air Canada Centre in Toronto for a live DVD set entitled, The Best Damn Tour: Live in Toronto.

Background
The tour was announced on November 6, 2007. Lavigne performed a private concert at the West Hollywood nightclub Whisky a Go Go, where she announced her tour produced by Live Nation. The singer stated the tour would be "bright" and "colorful" in contrast to her previous shows. Lavigne told the press she felt her previous tours were "stagnant" and "dark". She continued to say she wanted her upcoming trek to be a big flashy production, with a party theme. She would also attempt to sing her latest single, "Girlfriend", in different languages. Commenting on her tour announcement, Lavigne elaborated: "We finally get to go out [on tour] after a year of promo, a lot of hard work, so I'm excited to go out and play live. There's gonna be dancing; it's going to be really upbeat. I'm taking my show to the next level. It's still gonna be very me, and rock-influenced … but it's also gonna be diverse. It's going to open with a bang and dancers, and in the middle of the set [we're] coming down and doing acoustic stuff and me performing by myself. Being that it's my third album, I feel like I'm a lot better now. And I've got, like, 10 singles to play now, which makes it so much easier and so much better. When you play the hits onstage, it's the most exciting part of the show. And I have more to work with now … I have slower songs, songs like 'Sk8r Boi' and 'Girlfriend,' which are more upbeat. There's a lot to it. It's definitely not going to be boring."

The tour premiered in Victoria, British Columbia on March 5, 2008. On the same day, Kohl's launched Lavigne's clothing line, Abbey Dawn. It ended in Beijing; she was the first western artist to do a full tour in China. The tour faced slight controversy when the political group, the Pan-Malaysian Islamic Party protested the concert. The group felt that Lavigne's "punk" image was not suitable for children and was not appropriate during Merdeka (Independence Day). The concert was initially cancelled but resumed according to plan a few days later. The tour faced additional troubles when Lavigne was forced to cancel the remaining nine shows on her North American leg. The singer cited laryngitis for the cancellations while news outlets cited poor ticket sales. The singer posted an apology on her website and stated if possible, she would make the dates.

Critical reception

The tour received mixed reviews from music critics in the United States and Canada. Mike Devlin (Times Colonist) gave the premiere concert in Victoria, British Columbia two and a half out of five stars. He says, "Granted, it was the opening night of her world tour—which includes 15 dates in Canada—but the so-billed Best Damn Tour wasn’t even the Somewhat OK Damn Tour; it was just plain disappointing. And with tickets in the range of $60, the 75-minute concert clocked in just shy of one dollar per minute. Methinks some parents are feeling the sting right about now". Mike Ross (Jam!) gave the show at Rexall Place three and a half out of five stars. He explains, "I had the knives out last night, but was sadly disappointed that the show at Rexall Place wasn't as bad as I expected it to be. There is precedent: Last time through town, back in ought-five, Lavigne couldn't rock, couldn't sing and couldn't communicate with an audience".

Jason MacNeil (Jam!) felt the show at the Air Canada Centre was one of the best concerts in 2008. He elaborates, "However, when Lavigne strapped on a guitar, as she did during 'My Happy Ending', she appeared to be in her comfort zone, strumming along as hordes of glowsticks and camera flashes dotted the arena. Later on when she sat behind a pink piano for 'When You're Gone', she looked quite at ease". Miriam Ramierez (The Monitor) gave a positive review of the show at the Dodge Arena. She writes, "The excitement was hard to contain and any inkling of a struggling tour was put in the backburner here in the Rio Grande Valley. These kids were ready to party no matter what. I tried so hard to nit pick-tried so hard to find any slip up. And any which way she sang it was on point, full of energy (genuine or not) and super entertaining".

Synopsis
The concert starts off with an anonymous source spraying "Avril" on the screen in black graffiti, and then is colored in with a bright pink. When its fully colored, pink lights shine, stars flash on the screen, and her back up dancers run on with pink flags displaying the logo of her third album. A short instrumental of "Girlfriend" plays, as the flags are waved across the stage. Lavigne comes up on an elevator to perform "Girlfriend". Lavigne briefly talks to the audience, and introduces the next track I Can Do Better. 
Throughout the concert, Lavigne plays acoustic and electric guitar, drums and piano. A selection of tracks include "Sk8er Boi", "My Happy Ending", "When You're Gone", and the remix of "Girlfriend" featuring Lil' Mama.

Commercial performance

The Best Damn Tour was one of the most successful tours by Avril Lavigne. It went very well in Europe and Canada, where more than 150,000 tickets were purchased for both legs. In United Kingdom 50,000 tickets were sold, and $2,666,258 dollars grossed. The concert in London had the largest audience of the European leg. In Canada, an extra concert was added in Toronto in August 2008. In Japan, beyond two concerts held at Yoyogi National Gymnasium, Avril played for 45,000 fans at Tokyo Dome, one of the biggest stadiums in the country. Although the tour wasn't so successful in the United States at first, on the second leg, joined with the Jonas Brothers, 160,000 tickets were purchased, with an average of $861,599 dollars grossed per concert.

Broadcast and recordings

Avril Lavigne: The Best Damn Tour – Live in Toronto was recorded in Toronto, Ontario, Canada, on April 7, 2008, and released on DVD on 5 September of that year. It was certified Gold in countries such as Argentina, Canada and the U.S. and Silver in the UK.

Opening acts 

Boys Like Girls (North America—Leg 1)
Jonas Brothers  (Europe, select dates) (North America—Leg 2, select dates)
 PBH Club (Vienna)
Demi Lovato (North America—Leg 2, select dates)
Duke Squad (Montreal)
The Midway State (Sudbury, Toronto)

illScarlett (Saint John, Moncton, Halifax, St. John's)
Silverstein (Japan)
Ai Otsuka (Tokyo)
Puffy AmiYumi (Tokyo)

Setlist 
The following setlist is obtained from the April 7, 2008 concert in Toronto. It is not intended to represent all dates throughout the tour. 	

"Girlfriend"
"I Can Do Better"
"Complicated"
"My Happy Ending"
"I'm with You"
"I Always Get What I Want"
"Best Damn Dance Break" 
"When You're Gone"
"Innocence"
"Don't Tell Me"
"Hot"
"Losing Grip"
"Bad Reputation" 
"Everything Back But You"
"Runaway"
"Mickey"
"The Best Damn Thing"
"I Don't Have to Try"
"He Wasn't"
Encore
 "Girlfriend" 
 "Sk8er Boi"

Tour dates

Festivals and other miscellaneous performances
This concert was a part of "Musikfest"
This concert was a part of "Toms River Fest"
This concert was a part of the "Shenzhen International Summer Music Festival"
This concert was a part of the "Lijiang Snow Mountain Music Festival"

Cancellations and rescheduled shows

Personnel
Stage Director: Jamie King
Assistant Stage Director: Carla Kama
Tour Manager: Dan Cleland
Choreographers: Lindsey Blaufarb, Craig Hollaman and Jamie King
Assistant Choreographer: Sofia Toufa
Production Manager: Dale Lynch
Lighting Director: Brent Clark
Musical Director: Jim McGorman
Video Screen Director: William Crooks

Crew
FOH Engineer: Jim Yakabuski
Monitor Engineer: Matthew Peskie
System Engineer: Matt Blakely and Evan Hall
Video Screen Engineer: Daniel Deshara
Monitor System Technician: Shawn Shuell
PA Technician: Marco Giappesi, James Marcelek and Kevin Simmerman
Drum Technician: Ian O'Neill
Guitar Technician: Brian Kutzman
Director of Security: Derick Henry
Security: Matt Lavigne and Jon Zivcovic
Costume: Leah Smith
Wardrobe Supervisor: Louise Kennedy
Wardrobe Assistant: Amie Darlow
Hair/Makeup: Gabriel Panduro

Band
Drums: Rodney Howard
Lead Guitar: Steve Fekete
Rhythm Guitars: Avril Lavigne and Jim McGorman
Bass: Al Berry
Keyboards: Steve Ferlazzo
Vocals: Avril Lavigne, Caity Lotz, Jim McGorman and Sofia Toufa
Dancers: Lindsay Blaufarb, Jesse Brown, Jaime Burgos III, Sara Von Gillern, Caity Lotz and Sofia Toufa

Notes

References

Avril Lavigne concert tours
2008 concert tours